Guinea competed at the 1992 Summer Olympics in Barcelona, Spain.

Competitors
The following is the list of number of competitors in the Games.

Results by event

Athletics
Men's 100 m metres
Soryba Diakité 
 Heat — 11.10 (→ did not advance)

Men's 400 m Hurdles
Amadou Sy Savane
 Heat — 54.26 (→ did not advance, no ranking)

Men's 800 m metres
Mohamed Malal Sy Savané 
 Heat — 1:51.80 NR (→ did not advance)

Men's 1500 m metres
Mohamed Malal Sy Savané 
 Heat — 3:51.96 NR (→ did not advance)

Men's Long Jump
Soryba Diakité 
 Qualification — did not finish (→ did not advance)

References

Official Olympic Reports

Nations at the 1992 Summer Olympics
1992
Oly